Wireless LAN (WLAN) channels are frequently accessed using IEEE 802.11 protocols, and equipment that does so is sold mostly under the trademark Wi-Fi. Other equipment also accesses the same channels, such as Bluetooth. The radio frequency (RF) spectrum is vital for wireless communications infrastructure.

The 802.11 standard provides several distinct radio frequency bands for use in Wi-Fi communications: 900 MHz, 2.4 GHz, 3.6 GHz, 4.9 GHz, 5 GHz, 5.9 GHz, 6 GHz and 60 GHz. Each range is divided into a multitude of channels. In the standards, channels are numbered at 5 MHz spacing within a band (except in the 60 GHz band, where they are 2.16 GHz apart), and the number linearly relates to the centre frequency of the channel. Although channels are numbered at 5 MHz spacing, transmitters generally occupy at least 20 MHz, and standards allow for channels to be bonded together to form wider channels for higher throughput.

Countries apply their own regulations to the allowable channels, allowed users and maximum power levels within these frequency ranges. The ISM band ranges are also often used.

900 MHz (802.11ah)
802.11ah operates in sub-gigahertz unlicensed bands. Each world region supports different sub-bands, and the channels number depends on the starting frequency of the sub-band it belongs to. Thus, there is no global channels numbering plan, and the channels numbers are incompatible between world regions (and even between sub-bands of a same world region).

The following sub-bands are defined in the 802.11ah specifications:

2.4 GHz (802.11b/g/n/ax)

Fourteen channels are designated in the 2.4 GHz range, spaced 5 MHz apart from each other except for a 12 MHz space before channel 14.

Nations apply their own RF emission regulations to the allowable channels, allowed users and maximum power levels within these frequency ranges. Network operators should consult their local authorities as these regulations may be out of date as they are subject to change at any time.  Most of the world will allow the first thirteen channels in the spectrum.

Interference happens when two networks try to operate in the same band, or when their bands overlap. The two modulation methods used have different characteristics of band usage and therefore occupy different widths:
 The DSSS method used by legacy 802.11 and 802.11b (and the 11b-compatible rates of 11g) use 22 MHz of bandwidth. This is from the 11 MHz chip rate used by the coding system. No guard band is prescribed; the channel definition provides 3 MHz between 1, 6, and 11.
 The OFDM method used by 802.11a/b/g/n occupies a bandwidth of 16.25 MHz. The nameplate bandwidth is set to be 20 MHz, rounding up to a multiple of channel width and providing some guard band for signal to  attenuation along the edge of the band. This guardband is mainly used to accommodate older routers with modem chipsets prone to full channel occupancy, as most modern Wi‑Fi modems are not prone to excessive channel occupancy. 

While overlapping frequencies can be configured at a location and will usually work, it can cause interference resulting in slowdowns, sometimes severe, particularly in heavy use. Certain subsets of frequencies can be used simultaneously at any one location without interference (see diagrams for typical allocations). The consideration of spacing stems from both the basic bandwidth occupation (described above), which depends on the protocol, and from attenuation of interfering signals over distance. In the worst case, using every fourth or fifth channel by leaving three or four channels clear between used channels causes minimal interference, and narrower spacing still can be used at further distances. (The "interference" is usually not actual bit-errors, but the wireless transmitters making space for each other. The requirement of the standard is for a transmitter to yield when it detects another at a level of 3 dB above the noise floor, and when the level is higher than a threshold Pth which, for non Wi-Fi 6 systems, is between -76 and -80 dBm. Interference resulting in bit-error is rare.)

As shown in the diagram, bonding two 20 MHz channels to form a 40 MHz channel is permitted in the 2.4 GHz bands. These are generally referred to by the centres of the primary 20 MHz channel and the adjacent secondary 20 MHz channel (e.g. 1+5, 9+13, 13–9, 5–1). The primary 20 MHz channel is used for signalling and backwards compatibility, the secondary is only used when sending data at full speed.

3.65 GHz (802.11y)
Except where noted, all information taken from Annex J of IEEE 802.11y-2008

This range is documented as only being allowed as a licensed band in the United States. However, not in the original specification, under newer frequency allocations from the FCC, it falls under the 3.55–3.7Ghz Citizens Broadband Radio Service band. This allows for unlicensed use, under Tier 3 GAA rules, provided that the user doesn't cause harmful interference to Incumbent Access users or Priority Access Licensees and accepts all interference from these users, and also follows of all the technical requirements in CFR 47 Part 96 Subpart E

A 40 MHz band is available from 3655 to 3695 MHz. It may be divided into eight 5 MHz channels, four 10 MHz channels, or two 20 MHz channels, as follows:

4.9–5.0 GHz (802.11j) WLAN
In Japan starting in 2002, 100 MHz of spectrum from 4900 to 5000 MHz can be used for both indoor and outdoor connection once registered. Originally, another spectrum of 5030–5091 MHz was also available for use, however, it has been re-purposed and cannot be used after 2017.

50 MHz of spectrum from 4940 to 4990 MHz (WLAN channels 20–26) are in use by public safety entities in the United States. Within this spectrum there are two non-overlapping channels allocated, each 20 MHz wide. The most commonly used channels are 22 and 26.

5 GHz (802.11a/h/j/n/ac/ax)

United States 
Source:

In 2007, the FCC (United States) began requiring that devices operating in the bands of 5.250–5.350 GHz and 5.470–5.725 GHz must employ dynamic frequency selection (DFS) and transmit power control (TPC) capabilities. This is to avoid interference with weather-radar and military applications. In 2010, the FCC further clarified the use of channels in the 5.470–5.725 GHz band to avoid interference with TDWR, a type of weather radar system. In FCC parlance, these restrictions are now referred to collectively as the "Old Rules". On 10 June 2015, the FCC approved a "new" ruleset for 5 GHz device operation (called the "New Rules"), which adds 160 and 80 MHz channel identifiers, and re-enables previously prohibited DFS channels, in Publication Number 905462. This FCC publication eliminates the ability for manufacturers to have devices approved or modified under the Old Rules in phases; the New Rules apply in all circumstances 

Source: 
"To help meet the increasing demand for Wi-Fi and other unlicensed services, the FCC's new rules will make 45 megahertz of the 5.9 GHz band available for unlicensed use. This spectrum's impact will be further amplified by the fact that it is adjacent to an existing Wi-Fi band which, when combined with the 45 megahertz made available today, will support cutting edge broadband applications. These high-throughput channels—up to 160 megahertz wide—will enable gigabit Wi-Fi connectivity for schools, hospitals, small businesses, and other consumers. The Report and Order adopts technical rules to enable full-power indoor unlicensed operations in the lower 45 megahertz portion of the band immediately, as well as opportunities for outdoor unlicensed use on a coordinated basis under certain circumstances. Under the new rules, ITS services will be required to vacate the lower 45 megahertz of the band within one year."

United Kingdom 
The UK's Ofcom regulations for unlicensed use of the 5 GHz band is similar to Europe, except that DFS is not required for the frequency range 5.725–5.850 GHz and the SRD maximum mean e.i.r.p is 200 mW instead of 25 mW.

Additionally, 5.925–6.425 GHz is also available for unlicensed use, as long as it is used indoors with an SRD of 250 mW.

Germany 
Germany requires DFS and TPC capabilities on 5.250–5.350 GHz and 5.470–5.725 GHz as well; in addition, the frequency range 5.150–5.350 GHz is allowed only for indoor use, leaving only 5.470–5.725 GHz for outdoor and indoor use.

Since this is the German implementation of EU Rule 2005/513/EC, similar regulations must be expected throughout the European Union.

European standard EN 301 893 covers 5.15–5.725 GHz operation, and  v2.1.1 has been adopted.
6 GHz can now be used.

Austria 
Austria adopted Decision 2005/513/EC directly into national law. The same restrictions as in Germany apply, only 5.470–5.725 GHz is allowed to be used outdoor and indoor.

Japan 
Japan's use of 10 and 20 MHz-wide 5 GHz wireless channels is codified by Association of Radio Industries and Businesses (ARIB) document STD-T71, Broadband Mobile Access Communication System (CSMA). Additional rule specifications relating to 40, 80, and 160 MHz channel allocation has been taken on by Japan's Ministry of Internal Affairs and Communications (MIC).

Argentina
In Riobama 451 caba gran buenosaires, the use of TPC is required in the 5.150-5.350 GHz and 5.470-5.725 GHz bands is required, but devices without TPC are allowed with a reduction of 3 dB. DFS is required in the 5.250-5.350 GHz and 5.470-5.725 GHz bands, and optional in the 5.150-5.250 GHz band.

Australia 
 some of the Australian channels require DFS to be utilised (a significant change from the 2000 regulations, which allowed lower power operation without DFS). As per AS/NZS 4268 B1 and B2, transmitters designed to operate in any part of 5250–5350 MHz and 5470–5725 MHz bands shall implement DFS in accordance with sections 4.7 and 5.3.8 and Annex D of ETSI EN 301 893 or alternatively in accordance with FCC paragraph 15.407(h)(2). Also as per AS/NZS 4268 B3 and B4, transmitters designed to operate in any part of 5250–5350 MHz and 5470–5725 MHz bands shall implement TPC in accordance with sections 4.4 and 5.3.4 of ETSI EN 301 893 or alternatively in accordance with FCC paragraph 15.407(h)(1).

New Zealand 
New Zealand regulation differs from Australian.

Singapore 
Singapore regulation requires DFS and TPC to be used in the 5.250–5.350 GHz band to transmit more than 100 mW effective radiated power (EIRP), but no more than 200 mW, and requires DFS capability on 5.250–5.350 GHz below or equal to 100 mW EIRP, and requires DFS and TPC capabilities on 5.470–5.725 below or equal to 1000 mW EIRP. Operating 5.725–5.850 GHz above 1000 mW and below or equal to 4000 mW EIRP shall be approved on exceptional basis.

South Korea 
In South Korea, the Ministry of Science and ICT has public notices. 신고하지 아니하고 개설할 수 있는 무선국용 무선설비의 기술기준, Technical standard for radio equipment for radio stations that can be opened without reporting. They allowed 160 MHz channel bandwidth from 2018 to 2016–27.

China 
China MIIT expanded allowed channels  to add UNII-1, 5150–5250 GHz, UNII-2, 5250–5350 GHz (DFS/TPC), similar to European standards EN 301.893 V1.7.1.
China MIIT expanded allowed channels  to add UNII-3, 5725—5850 MHz.

Indonesia 
Indonesia allows use of frequency of 5.150–5.250 GHz and 5.250–5.350 GHz for indoors use with maximum EIRP of 200 mW and frequency of 5.725–5.825 GHz with maximum EIRP of 1500 mW for outdoors and 200 mW for indoors.

India 
In exercise of the powers conferred by sections 4 and 7 of the Indian Telegraph Act, 1885 (13 of 1885) and sections 4 and 10 of the Indian Wireless Telegraphy Act, 1933 (17 of 1933) and in supersession of notification under G.S.R. 46(E), dated 28 January 2005 and notification under G.S.R. 36(E), dated 10 January 2007 and notification under G.S.R. 38(E), dated 19 January 2007, the Central Government made the rules, called the Use of Wireless Access System including Radio Local Area Network in 5 GHz band (Exemption from Licensing Requirement) Rules, 2018. The rules include criteria's like 26 dB bandwidth of the modulated signal measured relative to the maximum level of the modulated carrier, the maximum power within the specified measurement bandwidth, within the device operating band; measurements in the 5725–5875 MHz band are made over a bandwidth of 500 kHz; measurements in the 5150–5250 MHz, 5250–5350 MHz, and 5470–5725 MHz bands are made over a bandwidth of 1 MHz or 26 dB emission bandwidth of the device. No licence shall be required under indoor and outdoor environment to establish, maintain, work, possess or deal in any wireless equipment for the purpose of low power wireless access systems. Transmitters operating in 5725–5875 MHz, all emissions within the frequency range from the band edge to 10 MHz above or below the band edge shall not exceed an EIRP of −17 dBm/MHz; for frequencies 10 MHz or greater above or below the band edge, emission shall not exceed an EIRP of −27 dBm/MHz.

5.9 GHz (802.11p)
The 802.11p amendment published on 15 July 2010, specifies WLAN in the licensed band of 5.9 GHz (5.850–5.925 GHz).

6 GHz (802.11ax and 802.11be)
The Wi-Fi Alliance has introduced the term "Wi-Fi 6E" to identify and certify IEEE 802.11ax devices that support this new band, which is also used by Wi-Fi 7 (IEEE 802.11be).

Initialisms (precise definition below):
 LPI: low power indoor
 VLP: very low power

United States
On 23 April 2020, the FCC voted on and ratified a Report and Order to allocate 1.2 GHz of unlicensed spectrum in the 6 GHz band (5.925–7.125 GHz) for Wi-Fi use.

Standard power

Standard power access points are permitted indoors and outdoors at a maximum EIRP of 36 dBm in the U-NII-5 and U-NII-7 sub-bands with automatic frequency coordination (AFC).

Low-power indoor (LPI) operation

Note: Partial channels indicate channels that span UNII boundaries, which is permitted in 6 GHz LPI operation. Under the proposed channel numbers, the U-NII-7/U-NII-8 boundary is spanned by channels 185 (20 MHz), 187 (40 MHz), 183 (80 MHz), and 175 (160 MHz). The U-NII-6/U-NII-7 boundary is spanned by channels 115 (40 MHz), 119 (80 MHz), and channel 111 (160 MHz).

For use in indoor environments, access points are limited to a maximum EIRP of 30 dBm and a maximum power spectral density of 5 dBm/MHz. They can operate in this mode on all four U-NII bands (5,6,7,8) without the use of automatic frequency coordination. To help ensure they are used only indoors, these types of access points are not permitted to be connectorized for external antennas, weather-resistant, or run on battery power.

Very-low-power devices
The FCC may issue a ruling in the future on a third class of very low power devices such as hotspots and short-range applications.

Canada
In November 2020, the Innovation, Science and Economic Development (ISED) of Canada published "Consultation on the Technical and Policy Framework for Licence-Exempt Use in the 6 GHz Band". They proposed to allow licence-exempt operations in the 6 GHz spectrum for three classes of radio local area networks (RLANs):

Standard power
For indoor and outdoor use. Maximum EIRP of 36 dBm and maximum power spectral density (PSD) of 23 dBm/MHz. Should employ Automated Frequency Coordination (AFC) control.

Low-power indoor (LPI)
For indoor use only. Maximum EIRP of 30 dBm and maximum PSD of 5 dBm/MHz.

Very low power (VLP)
For indoor and outdoor use. Maximum EIRP of 14 dBm and maximum PSD of -8 dBm/MHz.

Europe
ECC Decision (20)01 from 20 November 2020 allocated the frequency band from 5925 to 6425 MHz (corresponding to the US U-NII-5 band) for use by low-power indoor and very-low-power devices for Wireless Access Systems/Radio Local Area Networks (WAS/RLAN), with a portion specifically reserved for rail networks and intelligent transport systems.

United Kingdom
Since July 2020, the UK's Ofcom permitted unlicensed use of the lower 6 GHz band (5925 to 6425 MHz, corresponding to the US U-NII-5 band) by Low Power indoor and Very Low Power indoor and mobile Outdoor devices.

Australia
In April 2021, Australia's ACMA opened consultations for the 6 GHz band. The lower 6 GHz band (5925 to 6425 MHz, corresponding to the US U-NII-5 band) was approved for 250 mW EIRP indoors and 25 mW outdoors on March 4, 2022. Further consideration is also being given to releasing the upper 6 GHz band (6425 to 7125 MHz) for WLAN use as well, although nothing has been officially proposed at this time.

Japan
In September 2022, the Ministry of Internal Affairs and Communications announced amendments to the ministerial order and notices related to the Radio Act.

Low-power indoor (LPI)
For indoor use only. Maximum EIRP of 200mW.

Very low power (VLP)
For indoor and outdoor use. Maximum EIRP of 25mW.

Singapore 
In February 2023, Singapore's IMDA opened consultations for the 6GHz band.

60 GHz (802.11ad/ay)

The 802.11ad/ay standards, also known as WiGig, operate in the  V band unlicensed ISM band spectrum.

See also
 2.4 GHz radio use
 High-speed multimedia radio
 IEEE 802.11#Layer 2 – Datagrams

Notes
In the 2.4 GHz bands bonded 40 MHz channels are uniquely named by the primary and secondary 20 MHz channels, e.g. 9+13. In the 5 GHz bands they are denoted by the center of the wider band and the primary 20 MHz channel e.g. 42[40]

In the US, 802.11 operation on channels 12 and 13 is allowed under low power conditions. The 2.4 GHz Part 15 band in the US allows spread-spectrum operation as long as the 50 dB bandwidth of the signal is within the range of 2,400–2,483.5 MHz which fully encompasses channels 1 through 13.
A Federal Communications Commission (FCC) document clarifies that only channel 14 is forbidden and that low-power transmitters with low-gain antennas may operate legally in channels 12 and 13. Channels 12 and 13 are nevertheless not normally used in order to avoid any potential interference in the adjacent restricted frequency band, 2,483.5–2,500 MHz, which is subject to strict emission limits set out in 47 CFR § 15.205. Per recent FCC Order 16–181, "an authorized access point device can only operate in the 2483.5–2495 MHz band when it is operating under the control of a Globalstar Network Operating Center and that a client device can only operate in the 2483.5–2495 MHz band when it is operating under the control of an authorized access point"

Channel 14 is valid only for DSSS and CCK modes (Clause 18 a.k.a. 802.11b) in Japan. OFDM (i.e., 802.11g) may not be used. (IEEE 802.11-2007 §19.4.2)

References

Further reading
 
 

IEEE 802.11
Radio-related lists
Wi-Fi